The Fife and Forfar Yeomanry (FFY) was an Armoured Yeomanry Regiment of the British Army formed in 1793. It saw action in the Second Boer War, the First World War and the Second World War. It amalgamated with the Scottish Horse to form the Fife and Forfar Yeomanry/Scottish Horse in 1956. The lineage is maintained by "C" Fife and Forfar Yeomanry/Scottish Horse Squadron of The Scottish and North Irish Yeomanry based in Cupar in Fife.

History

Formation and early history
The Kirkcaldy Troop was raised in 1797 but, after becoming the Fife Yeomanry Cavalry in 1803, it was disbanded in 1828. The unit was re-raised as the Fife Yeomanry Cavalry in 1831 but was disbanded again in 1838. It was raised again as the 1st Fifeshire Mounted Rifle Volunteer Corps in 1860.
 
Meanwhile, the Forfar Yeomanry was raised in 1794 but it was also disbanded in 1828. The unit was re-raised as the Forfarshire Yeomanry in 1856 but disbanded again in 1862. It was raised again as the 1st Forfarshire Light Horse Volunteer Corps in 1876.

Second Boer War
On 13 December 1899, the decision to allow volunteer forces to serve in the Second Boer War was made. Due to the string of defeats during Black Week that same month, the British government realised they were going to need more troops than just the regular army, thus issuing a Royal Warrant on 24 December. This warrant officially created the Imperial Yeomanry (IY). The Royal Warrant asked standing Yeomanry regiments to provide service companies of approximately 115 men each. In addition to this, many British citizens (usually mid-upper class) volunteered to join the new regiment. The two regiments co-sponsored the 20th (Fife and Forfarshire Light Horse) Company, IY, which served in 6th (Scottish) Battalion, IY.  
 
In 1901 the 1st Fifeshire Mounted Rifle Volunteer Corps and the 1st Forfarshire Light Horse Volunteer Corps amalgamated to form the Fifeshire and Forfarshire Imperial Yeomanry. The word "Imperial" was dropped from the title on the formation of the Territorial Force in 1908.

The regiment was based at Hunter Street in Kirkcaldy at this time.

First World War

In accordance with the Territorial and Reserve Forces Act 1907 (7 Edw. 7, c.9), which brought the Territorial Force into being, the TF was intended to be a home defence force for service during wartime and members could not be compelled to serve outside the country. However, on the outbreak of war on 4 August 1914, many members volunteered for Imperial Service. Therefore, TF units were split in August and September 1914 into 1st Line (liable for overseas service) and 2nd Line (home service for those unable or unwilling to serve overseas) units. Later, a 3rd Line was formed to act as a reserve, providing trained replacements for the 1st and 2nd Line regiments.

1/1st Fife and Forfar Yeomanry
They were dismounted and eventually became the 14th (FFY) Battalion of the Black Watch.  As part of the 74th (Yeomanry) Division they served in Egypt and Palestine in 1917 and 1918 before moving to France in 1918.

2/1st Fife and Forfar Yeomanry
The 2nd Line regiment was formed in September 1914 and in January 1915 was assigned to the 2/1st Highland Mounted Brigade. On 31 March 1916, the remaining Mounted Brigades were ordered to be numbered in a single sequence; the brigade was numbered as 1st Mounted Brigade and joined the 1st Mounted Division in Norfolk. In July 1916, the 1st Mounted Division was reorganised as the 1st Cyclist Division and the regiment was transferred as a mounted unit to the 2nd Mounted Brigade in the new 1st Mounted Division (the former 3rd Mounted Division) in the Brentwood area.
 
In November 1916, the regiment was converted to a cyclist unit in 6th Cyclist Brigade at Ashington in Northumberland. By July 1917, it was at Acklington and it remained there until early 1918 when it went to Ireland with the 6th Cyclist Brigade. It was stationed at The Curragh until the end of the war.

3/1st Fife and Forfar Yeomanry
The 3rd Line regiment was formed in 1915; that summer, it was affiliated to a Reserve Cavalry Regiment at Aldershot. In June 1916, it was at Perth. The regiment was disbanded in early 1917 with personnel transferring to the 2nd Line or to the 4th (Reserve) Battalion of the Black Watch at Ripon.

Between the wars
On 7 February 1920, the Regiment was reconstituted in the Territorial Army with HQ still at Kirkcaldy. Following the experience of the war, it was decided that only the fourteen most senior yeomanry regiments would be retained as horsed cavalry, with the rest being transferred to other roles. As a result, on 6 January 1921, the Regiment was one of eight converted and reduced to 2nd (Fife and Forfar) Armoured Car Company, Tank Corps, later renumbered as 20th (Fife and Forfar) Armoured Car Company, Royal Tank Corps. On 30 April 1939, it was transferred to the Royal Armoured Corps.
 
By 1939, it had become clear that a new European war was likely to break out, and the doubling of the Territorial Army was authorised, with each unit forming a duplicate. The Lothians were expanded to an armoured regiment in August 1939 as the 1st Fife and Forfar Yeomanry and formed a duplicate 2nd Fife and Forfar Yeomanry in the same month.

Second World War

1st Fife and Forfar Yeomanry
The 1st Fife and Forfar Yeomanry landed in France as reconnaissance regiment for the 51st (Highland) Infantry Division in the British Expeditionary Force in September 1939 and then took part in the Dunkirk evacuation in June 1940. The battalion later served in the United Kingdom with the 28th Armoured Brigade in the 9th Armoured Division until August 1944 when it moved to North West Europe and saw action at the crossing of the Rhine with the 31st Armoured Brigade in the 79th Armoured Division in March 1945.

2nd Fife and Forfar Yeomanry
The 2nd Fife and Forfar Yeomanry took part in the Normandy landings with the 29th Armoured Brigade in the 11th Armoured Division in June 1944. It subsequently saw action in Operation Epsom in June 1944, Operation Goodwood in July 1944, Operation Bluecoat in August 1944 and the Battle of the Bulge in December 1944.

Post-war
When the Territorial Army was re-formed in May 1947, the regiment resumed its pre-war role as an Armoured Car Regiment. It amalgamated with the Scottish Horse to form the Fife and Forfar Yeomanry/Scottish Horse in 1956. Although The Fife and Forfar Yeomanry/Scottish Horse was disbanded in 1975, the linage is maintained by "C" Fife and Forfar Yeomanry/Scottish Horse Squadron of The Scottish and North Irish Yeomanry based in Cupar in Fife.

Memorials
A book of remembrance is housed at Cupar Old Parish Church and there is a carved stone plaque dedicated to "To the memory of all ranks – The Fife Light Horse and The Fife and Forfar Yeomanry 1860–1918" inside the ruined church building at Tulliallan Old Churchyard (also known as Woodlea Old Cemetery) at Kincardine on Forth.

Battle honours

The battle honours of the Fife and Forfar Yeomanry are displayed on the guidon which was laid up at Cupar Old Parish Church when the regiment was amalgamated. After amalgamation, the battle honours were carried on to the guidon of the Fife and Forfar Yeomanry/Scottish Horse and today are represented on the guidon of the Queen's Own Yeomanry. The Fife and Forfar Yeomanry was awarded the following battle honours (honours in bold are emblazoned on the regimental colours):

Guidons

The regiment's guidon is laid up in Cupar Old and St Michael of Tarvit Parish Church.

Honorary Colonels and Commanding Officers

Uniform

The cap badge of the FFY is a mounted knight (The Thane of Fife). It was also worn on the collars of the officers and men of the Squadron and on the arms above the chevrons of all Senior Non-Commissioned Officers. The black beret of the Royal Tank Regiment was worn as regimental headdress. The regiment wore a stable belt in the regimental colours of crimson and yellow with a dark blue stripe.

Regimental music
The Quick March of the Regiment was "Wee Cooper of Fife".

Affiliated regiments and formations
Affiliated regiments and formations were as follows:
 – 1st The Royal Dragoons

The Fife and Forfar Yeomanry Locomotive
A British Rail Class 55 'Deltic' diesel locomotive D9006 (later 55006), built between 1961 and 1962 by English Electric, was named after the Regiment. It was designed for the high-speed express passenger services on the East Coast Main Line between London King's Cross and Edinburgh.

See also

 Imperial Yeomanry
 List of Yeomanry Regiments 1908
 Yeomanry
 Yeomanry order of precedence
 British yeomanry during the First World War
 Second line yeomanry regiments of the British Army

Notes

References

Sources

Further reading

External links

 

 FFY Collection Details With Ogilby Trust
 The Scottish War Memorials Project
 

 
Yeomanry regiments of the British Army
Yeomanry regiments of the British Army in World War I
Regiments of the British Army in World War II
Scottish regiments
Highland regiments
Military units and formations in Dundee
Military units and formations in Fife
Military units and formations in Forfarshire
 
Military units and formations established in 1793
1794 establishments in Scotland
Military units and formations disestablished in 1956